Ceroplastes is a genus of wax scales in the family Coccidae. There are more than 130 described species in Ceroplastes.

See also
 List of Ceroplastes species

References

External links

 

Coccidae
Sternorrhyncha genera
Taxa named by John Edward Gray
Articles created by Qbugbot